Giubiasco railway station is a railway station in the Swiss canton of Ticino and municipality of Bellinzona. The station is on the Swiss Federal Railways Gotthard railway, between Bellinzona and Lugano, and is a junction point with several other lines.

To the south of Giubasco, the Gotthard Railway leaves the valley of the Ticino river that it has followed since it left the Gotthard Tunnel, and heads for Lake Lugano. Just to the south of Giubiasco station, the Gotthard railway's original line diverges to the south and commences its steep climb to the high-level Monte Ceneri Tunnel under the Monte Ceneri Pass. Just beyond the junction with the original line, a second triangular junction connects the new Gotthard main line with the Luino–Bellinzona railway, which in turn has a branch to Locarno.

As a major junction station, Giubiasco has two island platforms serving four platform tracks, together with a number of freight tracks. However, most long-distance passenger trains pass through the station without stopping, serving instead Bellinzona station, one stop to the north.

Services 
 the following services stop at Giubiasco:

Gallery

References

External links 
 
 

Railway stations in Ticino
Swiss Federal Railways stations